Stage One is the debut studio album by dancehall artist Sean Paul. It was released on 28 March 2000. Putting the CD in a CD-ROM drive gives access to the "Haffi Get De Gal Ha (Hot Gal Today)" music video and a link to the 2 Hard Records website.

Composition
Stage One features fellow Dutty Cup Crew member Looga Man, who collaborates on the tracks "Sound The Alarm" and "You Must Loose" while the up-and-coming Mr. Vegas was featured on the single "Haffi Get De Gal Ya (Hot Gal Today)", "Tiger Bone" and the skit, "Nicky". The intro is performed by Tony Matterhorn whereas the outro is performed by Paul's brother, Jason Henriques (also known as Jigzagula). "Faded" is a take on Shania Twain's "You're Still the One". "Tiger Bone" featuring Mr. Vegas uses uncredited portions of the melody of Enrique Iglesias's "Bailamos" in the refrain.

Track listing

Charts

References

Sean Paul albums
2000 debut albums
VP Records albums